West Branch French Creek is a  long tributary to French Creek that rises in Chautauqua County, New York and flows into Erie County, Pennsylvania. It is classed as a 2nd order stream on the EPA waters geoviewer site.

Course
West Branch French Creek rises in the Town of Mina, New York in western Chautauqua County and flows southwest into Erie County, Pennsylvania and then turns south towards Wattsburg, Pennsylvania.

Watershed
West Branch French Creek drains  of Erie Drift Plain (glacial geology). The watershed receives an average of 46.8 in/year of precipitation and has a wetness index of 474.55.  The watershed is about 44% forested.

Tributaries

See also 
 List of rivers of Pennsylvania
 List of tributaries of the Allegheny River

References

Rivers of New York (state)
Rivers of Pennsylvania
Tributaries of the Allegheny River
Rivers of Chautauqua County, New York
Rivers of Erie County, Pennsylvania